Eucalyptus steedmanii, commonly known as Steedman's gum or Steedman's mallet, is a species of mallet that is endemic to a small region of Western Australia. It has smooth, satiny bark, narrow elliptical leaves, flower buds in groups of three, white flowers and conical, four-winged fruit.

Description
The bark is smooth and satiny, ranging from grey to red-brown or a bright coppery colour. It has numerous ascending branches from low on the trunk, forming a dense crown. It blooms between January and March producing white flowers.

Taxonomy and naming
Eucalyptus steedmanii was first formally described by the botanist Charles Gardner in 1933 in the Journal of the Royal Society of Western Australia from a specimen collected by Henry Steedman south of Southern Cross in 1928. The specific epithet (steedmanii) honours Steedman.

Distribution and habitat
Steedman's gum is found on low hills and undulating plains between Ravensthorpe in the Goldfields-Esperance and Kondinin in the Wheatbelt region where it grows in gravelly loamy soils over ironstone. Six populations are known, five of these occur on unallocated Crown land, and one which is split occurs on  Crown land and a road verge.

Conservation status
This mallet was listed as Vulnerable in 2008 under the Environment Protection and Biodiversity Conservation Act 1999 and as "Threatened Flora (Declared Rare Flora — Extant)" by the Department of Environment and Conservation (Western Australia). The main threat to the tree is fire which kills adult plants, but regeneration by seed has been observed. Other threats include mining operations, firebreak maintenance and recreation activities.

See also
List of Eucalyptus species

References

Eucalypts of Western Australia
steedmanii
Myrtales of Australia
Plants described in 1934
Taxa named by Charles Gardner